The Drakensberger is a South African breed of cattle. It is a dual-purpose breed, reared both for milk and for meat. Its origins go back to the early nineteenth century, to the time of the Great Trek or earlier, when imported European stock from Holland with was cross-bred with black cattle of Sanga type obtained from nomadic pastoralist Khoikhoi peoples. It is one of several successful African composite breeds of Sanga and European stock. In the early days it was selected for adaptation to the sourveld biome of South Africa, and for black colour; it was kept principally along the Drakensberg escarpment, which gave rise to its modern name. It was established as a breed with the formation of the Drakensberger Cattle Breeders' Society in 1947.

History 

The origins of the Drakensberger go back to the early nineteenth century, to the time of the Great Trek or earlier, when imported European stock from Holland with was cross-bred with black cattle of Sanga type obtained from nomadic pastoralist Khoikhoi peoples. These cross-breeds developed into a type or breed known as the Vaderlander; there was some selection both for black colour and for adaptation to the sourveld biome of South Africa.

Characteristics

Use

References 

Cattle breeds originating in South Africa
Cattle breeds